Fitz of Depression was an American punk rock band from Olympia, Washington, formed in 1987. The band released three albums before splitting up in 1997. There were brief reunion tours in 2000 and 2002. The band continued to play, particularly in the Northwestern United States, with occasional west coast tours until the untimely death of founding member and singer/guitarist Mike Dees.

History
Formed in Olympia in 1988, the band's original lineup consisted of Mike Dees (Mikey Dees vocals, guitar), Jim Koontz (bass guitar), and Craig Becker (drums). They began playing local venues in the Olympia area. This lineup recorded an eight track EP, released on the Mumble Something label. Koontz left the band, to be replaced by Ryan von Bargen. The band's next release was "The Awakening", a single on the Meat label released in January 1991. A benefit concert was held in April 1991 to help Dees pay fines for traffic violations and avoid jail, with the band joined on stage by Bikini Kill and Nirvana and the concert filmed for the documentary film Hype!. Von Bargen was replaced by Justin Warren. A self-titled debut album, which had been recorded in 1991, was the band's last release on Meat, subsequently signing with K Records, for whom they debuted with the July 1994 album Let's Give It a Twist (released in the UK the following year on Fire Records). Warren (who later joined Quitters, Inc.) had himself been replaced by Brian Sparhawk in 1993. In April 1995, while touring the UK, the band recorded a session for John Peel's BBC Radio 1 show, at the Maida Vale BBC studios in London. Third and final album Swing was released in April 1996. The band signed to Warner Bros., but split up in 1997 before any releases for the company.

The band reunited briefly in 2000 to tour with Bad Brains (at the time going by the name Soul Brains due to issues with their record label), but they split again before the tour was completed. They reunited again in 2002 for some live shows.

Sparhawk joined Two Ton Boa, and then joined the Resident Kings in 2011. Craig Becker went on to play with The Viles, Deadbeat Hearts and the Natrons.

On July 23, 2018, the band announced via Facebook that they plan to reform and record a new record, followed by a European tour in the Spring of 2019.

On 4 June 2019, Mikey Dees was found dead in his home of an apparent heart attack suffered in his sleep. He was 48.

Musical style
The band's sound has been characterized as hardcore punk, 'metal-punk', or 'power punk'.

Discography

Albums
Fitz of Depression (1993), Meat - 10-inch LP
Let's Give It a Twist (1995), K
Swing (1996), K

EPs
Fitz of Depression, Mumble Something - 7-inch EP
Pigs are People Too (1995), Negative Feedback
Peel Sessions - BBC Radio One (2003), Very Necessary

Singles
"The Awakening" (1991), Meat
"Pissbutt" (1992), Blatant
"Take It Away"/"Jenny/867-5309" (1993), Negative Feedback
"Lie" (1994), K
Spawning Monsters: "See Me, Hear Me"/"Miracle Man" (1995), Fire
"Young and Free" (1995), Fire
"I'm the Man" (1995), Yo Yo
"Seemingly Vague" (1996), Kill Rock Stars

References

External links
Fitz of Depression on Myspace

Punk rock groups from Washington (state)
Musical groups established in 1987
Musical groups disestablished in 1997